Proactive, Preemptive Operations Group (P2OG, PPOG) is a proposed U.S. intelligence agency that would employ "black world" (black operations) tactics.

The Defense Science Board (DSB) conducted a 2002 "DSB Summer Study on Special Operations and Joint Forces in Support of Countering Terrorism." Excerpts from that study, dated August 16, 2002, recommend the creation of a super-Intelligence Support Activity, an organization it dubs the Proactive, Preemptive Operations Group (P2OG), to bring together CIA and military covert action, information warfare, intelligence and cover and deception. For example, the Pentagon and CIA would work together to increase human intelligence (HUMINT), forward/operational presence and to deploy new clandestine technical capabilities. Concerning the tactics P2OG would use,

Among other things, this body would launch secret operations aimed at "stimulating reactions" among terrorists and states possessing weapons of mass destruction—that is, for instance, prodding terrorist cells into action and exposing themselves to "quick-response" attacks by U.S. forces.

Such tactics would hold "states/sub-state actors accountable" and "signal to harboring states that their sovereignty will be at risk", the briefing paper declares.

See also
 Operation Northwoods

References

External links
 Federation of American Scientists (FAS) Project on Government Secrecy, "DOD Examines 'Preemptive' Intelligence Operations," Secrecy News, Vol. 2002, Issue No. 107, October 28, 2002.
 Chris Floyd, "Into the Dark: The Pentagon Plan to Provoke Terrorist Attacks". Also appeared in Moscow Times, November 1, 2002, pg. XXIV; St. Petersburg Times, November 5, 2002; and under the title "Into the Dark: The Pentagon Plan to Foment Terrorism," Collected Writings: Past Articles by Chris Floyd, April 15, 2005. This article was chosen number four in Project Censored's Censored 2004: The Top 25 Censored Media Stories of 2002-2003, "(#4) Rumsfeld's Plan to Provoke Terrorists."
 Seymour M. Hersh, "The Coming Wars: What the Pentagon can now do in secret," The New Yorker, January 24, 2005 edition. Referenced by the below Chris Floyd article.
 Chris Floyd, Global Eye, Moscow Times, January 21, 2005, Issue 3089, pg. 112; also appeared as "Darkness Visible: The Pentagon Plan to Foment Terrorism is Now in Operation," Collected Writings: Past Articles by Chris Floyd, April 15, 2005.

Espionage
Government documents of the United States
United States intelligence agencies
United States intelligence operations
2002 works
Counterterrorism